St. Xavier's Boys' College is a national school in Mannar, Sri Lanka.

See also
 :Category:Alumni of St. Xavier's Boys' College
 List of schools in Northern Province, Sri Lanka
 St. Xavier's Girls' College
 List of Jesuit sites

References

External links
 Official Website

Boys' schools in Sri Lanka
National schools in Sri Lanka
Buildings and structures in Mannar, Sri Lanka
Schools in Mannar District